Billy Noke  is an Australian former professional rugby league footballer who played for the St. George Dragons, Brisbane Broncos, South Sydney Rabbitohs and the Western Suburbs Magpies. He played primarily in the back row. He is the cousin of Kyle Noke.

Career
He starred in the unbeaten Australian Schoolboy Tour of England in 1979 before being a member of the premiership winning St. George Dragons Presidents Cup team in 1981. 

He was then graded by St George in 1982 as an import (there was a local junior/import rule at the time with each club being limited to a number of imported players) Noke, took a risk doing this as one more year in the local junior's competition would have given him local junior status. 

He would then not have been included in the limited number of imported players a club could have at the time, he really had to back his ability to do this with many other imported forwards at the club experienced NSW & Australian representatives. 

A talented ball-player with a good kicking game, Noke played in the Dragons' 1985 Grand Final loss to Canterbury. In the same season, he won the Dally M second rower of the year, but his career did not take off as expected when he went to the Broncos upon their inception into the NSWRL premiership. His return to Sydney, with seasons at Souths and Wests was similarly unsuccessful.

Noke captain-coached Turvey Park to the 1993 Group 9 Premiership.

References

1963 births
Living people
Australian rugby league players
Brisbane Broncos players
Rugby league players from Dubbo
Rugby league second-rows
South Sydney Rabbitohs players
St. George Dragons players
Western Suburbs Magpies players